Grand Popo Football Club was a French electronic music group of a DJ television presenter/chat show host and producer/classically-trained pianist who studied at the National Conservatory in Paris, respectively.

The duo apparently adopted their unusual moniker after Ariel Wizman visited the West African village of Grand-Popo in Benin to film a television programme and decided that the community was missing a football club. After studying piano, composition, and electronic music, Nicolas Errèra became involved in theatre and successfully directed short films (winning the Clermont-Ferrand prize in 1991, for his Going to Dieppe Without Seeing the Sea) as well as becoming half of pop duo 2 Source. Wizman, meanwhile, DJed at Colombian parties in Paris. He became renowned for his show on Radio Nova that mixed easy listening, soundtracks, and electronic music. When the show transferred to television, Wizman brought in guests as disparate as Johnny Rotten and German philosophers: fortuitously, his guests also included 2 Source, an invite that rekindled Wizman and Errera's previous friendship.

GPFC's first recording appeared on the Source Lab 3 compilation in 1996, but they did not release their debut, Shampoo Victims, until 2000 (the album was re-released two years later). The duo's biggest hit was "Men Are Not Nice Guys", the English version of their 2001 song "Les hommes c'est pas des mecs bien", which charted in Australia and the UK.

Together the duo creates Gallic pop that seems to revere and revile the music of peers such as Daft Punk, Air, and Cassius in equal measure. They dubbed a song that sounded curiously like the former "One More Song on the Market", while "Nothing to Say in a House Song" railed against the duo's perceived vacuousness in house music by (vacuously) repeating the title with no other lyrics. Shampoo Victims also included a duo of collaborations with friends/heroes Sparks. Russell and Ron Mael provide both lyrics and vocals on the album's tracks "La nuit est là" (The Night Is Here) and "Yo quiero mas dinero" (I Want More Money). As if to accentuate this fondness for '70s/'80s pop, the duo also sampled Giorgio Moroder's "Love Fever" on "Each Finger Has an Attitude". The group has not been active since 2010.

Discography

Albums
 Shampoo Victims (2000)
 Venom in the Grass (2010)

Singles

References

French house music groups
Musical groups from Paris